Herman is an unincorporated community in L'Anse Township of Baraga County in the U.S. state of Michigan. It was established in 1901 along a branch of the Duluth, South Shore and Atlantic Railway approximately midway between Nestoria and L'Anse.  A post office opened January 13, 1903, and was discontinued on December 5, 1970.

The settlement was founded by Herman Keranen (born November 5, 1862 in Puolanka, Oulun Laani, Finland), who had been working in the lumber camps when he bought several  plots and constructed a crude log cabin. With the money he earned from lumbering, he established the largest and most productive farm in the area, which led to the community being named for him. For a number of years, the primary access to the area was via the Duluth, South Shore and Atlantic Railroad Company. A school was built in 1903, and a post office followed in 1904. The Herman Athletic Association was organized in 1912, and a farmer's cooperative association in 1919. The area boasted at least one store and one mercantile business.

On December 19, 1996, the town received the single largest snowfall in Michigan history, with  falling in the single day.

Other early residents included Matt Anderson, Gust Kontio, Erkki Kayramo, Nels Majhannu, Jacob Kuusisto, Henry Pasanen, Joseph Pekkala and Eli Korpi.

Climate

References

Further reading 
 
 

Unincorporated communities in Baraga County, Michigan
Unincorporated communities in Michigan